List of compositions by Brazilian composer Henrique Oswald, by genre.

Opera
La croce d'oro [The Golden Cross], 3 acts (1872, unpublished, performances unknown)
Il Neo (La mouche), Novelletta musicale in 3 piccoli quadri, 1 act (1900, libretto by Eduardo Filippi, after La mouche by Alfred de Musset;  unpublished, performed in 1900?, 1925, 1929?; 1950 and/or 1952; 1954)
Le Fate, Fiaba musicale in due parti [The Fairies], 2 acts, (1902-1903, libretto by Eduardo Filippi; unpublished, performances unknown)

Vocal with orchestra
Invocação à arte [Invocation of the arts], for chorus and orchestra (1917)
I. L'aveugle in G minor
II. Le troubadour in C major
III. L'enamourée in B minor

Sacred Music (complete list)
For mixed chorus
Mass in C minor (Missa Solene) - SATB chorus, string orchestra, organ (1925, edited by Vasti Atique Ferraz de Toledo, 2009; there is a manuscript version omitting orchestra)
Requiem in E minor (Missa de Réquiem) - SATB chorus, organ ad lib. (1925; edited by Susana Cecilia Igayara, 2001)
Pater noster - SATB chorus, harmonium ad lib. (1926)
Tantum ergo - SATB chorus, harmonium ad lib. (1930)
For female chorus
3 Motets for female chorus (1913, the grouping proposed by Susana Cecilia Igayara)
Ave Maria - SSAA chorus, harmonium ad lib.
Magnificat - SSAA chorus, harmonium ad lib.
O salutaris hostia - SSAA chorus, harmonium / SSAA chorus, string orchestra, organ
3 Motets for female chorus (1930, the grouping proposed by Susana Cecilia Igayara)
Tantum ergo - SSA chorus, harmonium
Veni Sancte Spiritus - SSA chorus, harmonium
Memorare - SSAA chorus, harmonium
For male chorus
3 Motets for male chorus (1930, a version of the same motets for female chorus)
Tantum ergo - TTB chorus, harmonium
Veni Sancte Spiritus - TTB chorus, harmonium
Memorare - TTBB chorus, harmonium
Unfinished
Te Deum (only one-page sketch)

Symphony orchestra

Original compositions
Suite d'orchestre (1884; dedicated to Pedro II of Brazil; unpublished; autograph marked Op.1)
'Festa', Symphonic poem (1885)
Sinfonietta (Sinfonia) in D minor op. 27 (1897; edited as Sinfonia, Op. 27, in 2001)
Symphonia in C major op. 43 (1910–11)
Prelude and Fugue in D minor
Prelude and Fugue in B minor

Transcriptions for symphony orchestra
Nocturno op. 6 nº 2
4º Nocturno
Elegía (1896)
Paysage d'automne
En rêve
Il neige!..
Idylle op. 33 nº 2
Sur la plage op. 33 nº 1

String orchestra

Original compositions
Prelude and Fugue in C minor
6 Fugues
Gavotte in F minor
Minuet in D major
Sarabande
Scherzo
2 Romances
Habanera in G major
Prelude and Fugue in A flat major
Prelude and Fugue in A minor

Transcriptions for string orchestra
Sonhando
Bebé S'endort op. 36 nº 1
Serenade

Concertante
Violin concerto in D minor (ca.1888; edited by M.G. Felice, 1997)
Piano Concerto in G minor, op. 10 (1890; dedicated to Giuseppe Buonamici)
Andante and Variations (Andante e Variações) in E minor for piano and orchestra (1918; edited by Eduardo Monteiro, 2002)

Chamber works

Violin and piano
Violin Sonata in E major op. 36 (finished February 14, 1908)
Canto elegíaco (1902)
3 Berceuses
2 Romances op. 37 (pub. 1908)
Romance in E major op. 7 no. 2 (arranged from piano solo version; edited by Juliana D'Agostini and Eduardo Monteiro, 2007)
Molto adagio
Noturne

Cello and piano
Cello Sonata in D minor op. 21 (1898, pub. 1982 by José Eduardo Martins; a second version of 1901 exists in autograph manuscript; a 1901 manuscript arrangement for double bass edited by Fausto Borém De Oliveira, 1993)
Sonata-Fantasia in E major op. 44 (1915/1916, pub. 1982 by José Eduardo Martins; may be only the first movement of a not realized longer sonata)
Elegy in F minor (1898)
Berceuse (1898)
Sognando in F [sic] major op. 3 no. 2 (arranged from piano solo version)

Other with piano
Piano Trio in G minor op. 9 - piano, violin, cello (1889; edited by Helcio Vaz do Val, 2012)
Piano Trio in D major op. 28 - piano, violin, cello (1897)
Piano Trio in B minor op. 45 - piano, violin, cello (1916, published ca.1917/18)
Sonatina (Piccolo trio) in F minor - piano, violin, cello
'Serrana' in F major - piano, violin, cello (1918/1925, published 1927)
Piano Quartet No. 1 (Piccolo Quartetto) in F minor, op. 5 - piano, violin, viola, cello (1888)
Piano Quartet No. 2 in G major op. 26 - piano, violin, viola, cello (second half of 1898; dedicated to Emilio Giorgetti; published by José Eduardo Martins, 2001)
Piano Quintet in C major op. 18 - piano, 2 violins, viola, cello (1894/5, published 1937 by Luiz Heitor Corrêa de Azevedo; dedicated to Signora Karl Hillebrand)

Other without piano
String Quartet No. 1 (Sonatina) op. 16 - 2 violins, viola, cello
String Quartet No. 2 in E minor (Quarteto Brasileiro) op. 17 - 2 violins, viola, cello
String Quartet No. 3 op. 39 - 2 violins, viola, cello (1908; dedicated to Francisco Braga)
String Quartet No. 4 in C minor op. 46 - 2 violins, viola, cello (finished in July–August 1921)
String Quartet op. 47 - 2 violins, viola, cello (June 1927, incomplete, 2 unfinished versions)
'Estudio-scherzo' in B minor for string quartet
String Octet - 4 violins, 2 violas, 2 cellos (1899/1900)

Organ
Fuga in E minor
Petite maítrise fuga
Prelúdio in A minor
Prelúdio e Fuga in A major
Prelúdio e Fuga in B minor
Prelúdio e Fuga in F major
Sonata in C major (1925, pub. 1931 by Ricordi)

Piano

Published
Souveir-Polka in E major, op. 1
Macchiette, op. 2 (12 pieces in 4 books): Le campane della sera, Scherzo, Valzer lento, Canzonetta, Ninna-nanna, Marcia, Romanza, Seconda Gavotta, Pastorale, Minuetto, Sarabanda, La caccia (published by Venturini)
Pagine d'album (Fogli d'album), op. 3: Preludio, Sognando, Improptu, In Hamac, Romanza, Scherzo (no. 2 is 1885; published by Venturini)
No. 2 arranged for cello and piano
Six Morceaux, op. 4: Valse, Rêverie, Menue, Berceuse, Barcarola, Improptu (published by Venturini)
Deux Nocturnes, op. 6 (published by Venturini)
Trois Romances sans paroles, op. 7 (ca.1888; published by Venturini; dedicated to Mr. le Comte Alexandre Sigray de San Marzano)
No. 2 was arranged for violin and piano
Trois Morceaux, op. 8: Valse, Polonaise, Tarantelle
Deux Valses Caprice, op. 11 (published by Venturini)
Quatre Morceaux, op. 12: Sérénade, Valse Improptu, Berceuse, Tarantelle (published by Venturini)
Seis peças para piano, op. 14: Berceuse, Mazurka, Tarantella, Barcarola, Noturno, Scherzo
Sept Miniatures, op. 16: Confidência, Mazurka, Travessa, Ingenuidade, Doce Aflição, Saudade, Capricho
Improptu, op. 19
Feuilles d´Album, op. 20: Inquietude, Chansonette, Feux Follets, Désir Ardent
Trois Morceaux, op. 23: Menuet, Romance, Valse
Deux Valses, op. 25
Album, op. 32: Romance, Valse, Sérénade, Menuet
Album, op. 33: Sur la Plage, Idyle, Pierrot
Polonaise, op. 34 No. 1
Album, op. 36: Bébé s'endort, Pierrot se Meurt, Chauve-Sourris
Edição Escolar: Pequena Marcha, Valsa, Primeira Marcha, Segunda Marcha, Gavotta, Triste, Chansonette, Folha d' Album, Valsa Lenta, Mazurka, Tarantella, Scherzando.
Un Revê
En Nacelle
Sérénade Grise
Sérénade
Serenatella
Il neige!..
Valsa lenta op. posth.
Trois Études op. 42
Estudo (posthumous edition)
Étude pour la main gauche (1921, pub.1982)
Scherzo-Étude (1902, pub. 1982)
Variações sobre um tema de Barrozo Netto (1918/1919)

Unpublished
Mazurka (1872)
Barcarola No.2 (1872)
Marcia religiosa (1873)
Berceuse orientale (ca.1870s)
Quand te reverrais-je? (1876)
Romance sans paroles (1876)
3 Romances sans paroles (1878): Bonheur, Agitato, La plante [?] / La houle [?]
Nocturne (1883)
Menueto (1883)
Gavotte (1883)
Berceuse (1886)
Lento e espressivo (1887)
Vivacissimo (1887)
Tema e variações
Marchons
Molto allegro
Hino da família Oswald unida (1907)

Voice with piano (complete list)
First period (1872–1879)
Ave Maria in F major, for voice and piano or harmonium (1872, Latin text; pub. by Bevilacqua, dedicated to Oswald's mother; new version for mezzo-soprano 1876)
Romanza in C major (1879, Italian text by Oswald's father-in-law Ottavio Gasperini; inedited)
Romanza in C minor (1879, Italian text by Oswald's wife Laudomia; inedited, only incomplete manuscript)
Stornello in E minor (1879, Italian text by Oswald's wife Laudomia; inedited)
Berceuse in B major (1879, French text by Oswald's wife Laudomia; inedited)

Second period (1897–1904)
Ave! in D major (1897, Italian text by Solone Monti; dedicated to Sophia da Silva Prado; published without publisher name)
Ave! (version in Portuguese; first performed on September 2, 1903 by Ottavio Frosini in Rio de Janeiro; published by Ricordi Brasileira)
Habanera in E minor (1898, Portuguese text by unknown author; inedited)
Non ti svegliar in G major (1900, Italian text by Eduardo Filippi; arrangement of a Berceuse from Oswald's opera Il Neo; first performed on September 2, 1903 by Ottavio Frosini in Rio de Janeiro; published by Bevilacqua in supplement to Renascença No. 1, 1904)
Ophelia (Ofélia), Poemetto lirico, in 5 parts (1901, Italian text by Solone Monti; first performed: IV–V on November 13, 1903, I on November 16, 1903, complete cycle on October 29, 1905; published by Genesio Venturini, 1904; III and V were orchestrated by Oswald; manuscripts of I, III an V are marked Op.31)
I. (no title) in A major
II. Ophelia in D major
III. Il genio della foresta in E minor
IV. L'angelo del cimitero in G major
V. La morta in E major
A Anunciação in E minor (1903, Portuguese text by Coelho Neto; part of Neto's Partoral with music by four different composers: Prelúdio by Santana Gomes, A Anunciação by Oswald, A Visitação by Francisco Braga and Natal by Alberto Nepomuceno; published by Bevilacqua, 1904)

Third period (1910–1921)
Minha estrela in E major (1916; Portuguese text by Esther Ferreira Vianna; dedicated to singer Frederico Nascimento Filho; first performed on August 10, 1916 by Carlos de Carvalho in Rio de Janeiro; published by Bevilacqua; a manuscript with orchestrated version exists)
Aos sinos! in D major (1916, Portuguese text by Olavo Bilac; dedicated to Carlos de Carvalho; first premiered by him in August 1916 in Rio de Janeiro; published by Bevilacqua)
Cantiga bohemia in A minor (1916; Portuguese text by Olegário Mariano; dedicated to Carlos de Carvalho; first premiered by him in August 1916 in Rio de Janeiro; inedited)
Mendigo! in D major (1921, Portuguese text by unknown author; inedited)

Works without artistic pretenses
Ad una rondinella in E major (1874, Italian text by unknown author; dedicated to Maria Tosi; inedited)
Cris du coeur in B major (undated; French text by unknown author; Oswald's authourship is dubious; piano part in pencil; inedited)
Hino para a 1a comunhão in E major (undated; Portuguese text by Maria Gertrudes Bicalho Oswald; inedited)
Hynno in B major (undated; Portuguese text by count Affonso Celso; dedicated to Cardeal Arcoverde; inedited)
Les adieux fraternels in F major (undated; French text by unknown author; piano part not composed; Oswald's authourship is dubious; inedited)
Vêm às nossas mãos floridas... in F major (undated; Portuguese text by unknown author; at two points a chorus is indicated; inedited)
Canto da coroação in C major (1919; Portuguese text by unknown author; dedicated to Antonio Pinto, vicar of Campo Grande; inedited)

References

Sources consulted 

LATIN AMERICAN & HISPANIC-AMERICAN ORGAN MUSIC: Compiled by James Welch and Calvert Johnson, 2008
Cássia Paula Fernandes Bernardino. Ofélia, poemeto lírico de Henrique Oswald: confluências entre música e texto. São Paulo, 2009
Susana Cecilia Igayara. Henrique Oswald e a música vocal.  Revista Glosas. Revista do Movimento Patrimonial pela Música Portuguesa, v. 9, p. 19-25. Setembro 2015.

 
Oswald